Simon Knak (born January 27, 2002) is a Swiss professional ice hockey right winger who is currently playing with HC Davos of the National League (NL). Knak was drafted by the Nashville Predators in the sixth round, 179th overall, of the 2021 NHL Entry Draft.

Playing career
Knak made his professional debut during the 2018–19 season with EHC Kloten of the Swiss League (SL), appearing in 3 games and picking up 1 assist. On July 1, 2019, Knak left Kloten U20 team to join the Portland Winterhawks of the Western Hockey League (WHL) for the 2019–20 season.

Knak joined HC Davos of the National League (NL) for the start of the 2020–21 season as the WHL season was postponed. On February 25, 2021, it was announced that Knak would return to Portland for the start of the WHL season following the game against HC Fribourg-Gottéron on February 26, 2021.

On August 2, 2021, Knak signed his first professional contract, agreeing to a two-year deal with HC Davos through the end of the 2022–23 season.

International play
Knak was named to Switzerland's U20 national team for the 2020 World Junior Championships in the Czech Republic. He was again named to the team for the 2021 edition in Edmonton, Canada. Knak was named captain of the team for this edition. He scored 1 goal in 4 games as Switzerland failed to reach the 1/4 finals for the first time in 5 years.

Career statistics

International

References

External links

Living people
2002 births
HC Davos players
Nashville Predators draft picks
Swiss ice hockey right wingers
Ice hockey people from Zürich
Portland Winterhawks players